The Great Gay Road is a 1920 British silent drama film directed by Norman MacDonald and starring Stewart Rome, Pauline Johnson and John Stuart. It was an adaptation of a 1910 novel The Great Gay Road by Tom Gallon which was later made as a sound film The Great Gay Road in 1931.

Cast
 Stewart Rome - Hilary Kite 
 Pauline Johnson - Nancy 
 John Stuart - Rodney Foster 
 Ernest Spaulding - Crook Perkins 
 A. Bromley Davenport - Sir Crispin Vickrey 
 Ralph Forster - Backus 
 Helena Lessington - Mother Grogan

References

External links

1920 films
1920 drama films
British drama films
Films based on British novels
British black-and-white films
British silent feature films
1920s English-language films
1920s British films
Silent drama films
Silent romantic drama films
British romantic drama films